Yuxarı Nüvədi (also, Verkhniye Nyuady, Yukhary Nyuvedi, and Yukhary-Nyugadi) is a village and municipality in the Lankaran Rayon of Azerbaijan.  It was recorded at a population of 2,084.  The municipality consists of the villages of Yuxarı Nüvədi and Mikolan.

References 

Populated places in Lankaran District